Speed skating at the 2006 Winter Olympics was held over ten days, from 11 to 25 February. Twelve events were contested at the Oval Lingotto.

Medal summary

Men's events

 
* Skaters who did not participate in the final, but received medals.

Women's events

* Skaters who did not participate in the final, but received medals.

Medal table

Records

The combination of low altitude and high humidity at the Oval Lingotto in Turin created fairly slow ice conditions, relative to previous Olympic ovals, such as the Utah Olympic Oval. This meant that no world records in speed skating were set at the Games, and the only Olympic records set were in the two debut events, the men's and women's team pursuits.

Participating NOCs
Nineteen nations competed in the speed skating events at Torino.

References

 
2006
Olympics, 2006
2006 Winter Olympics events
2006 in speed skating